Jen Gross is a Democratic member of the Montana Senate, where she represents District 25. She was first elected in 2016. Gross was re-elected to the state senate in 2020.

Gross has worked as a community organizer and on political campaigns since 2008. She was the manager of field operations at Planned Parenthood of Montana when she was appointed as the replacement candidate for SD 25 in August 2016.

In December 2019, The Washington Post detailed how an editorial in the Billings Gazette against Medicare-for-all by Gross was drafted with the help of a lobbying group, Partnership for America's Health Care Future. Gross said she writes less than half of her op-eds.

References

External links
 Montana Legislature page

Living people
Democratic Party Montana state senators
Montana State University Billings alumni
Politicians from Billings, Montana
21st-century American politicians
Year of birth missing (living people)